Axel Rodrigues de Arruda (born 9 January 1970), simply known as Axel, is a Brazilian football coach and former player who played as a midfielder. He is the current head coach of São Caetano.

Axel previously played for Santos Futebol Clube, São Paulo Futebol Clube, Clube Atlético Paranaense, Sport Club do Recife, Paraná Clube and Figueirense Futebol Clube in the Campeonato Brasileiro.

Club statistics

National team statistics

References

External links

1970 births
Living people
Sportspeople from Santos, São Paulo
Brazilian footballers
Brazilian football managers
Brazilian expatriate footballers
Expatriate footballers in Japan
Campeonato Brasileiro Série A players
Campeonato Brasileiro Série B players
J1 League players
Brazil international footballers
Santos FC players
São Paulo FC players
Sevilla FC players
Esporte Clube Bahia players
Club Athletico Paranaense players
Sport Club do Recife players
Botafogo Futebol Clube (SP) players
Cerezo Osaka players
Associação Atlética Portuguesa (Santos) players
Paraná Clube players
Figueirense FC players
Campinense Clube players
Clube Atlético Taboão da Serra managers
Association football midfielders
Associação Desportiva São Caetano managers